Narcissus primigenius is a species of the genus Narcissus (Daffodils) in the family Amaryllidaceae. It is classified in Section Pseudonarcissus. It is native to northwest Spain.

References

Bibliography 

Narcissus primigenius  The Plant List
Narcissus primigenius  World Checklist

primigenius
Garden plants
Flora of Spain